Gasimov brothers were the co-owners of the "Gasimov Brothers and Co" construction company, which carried out the construction of the most of the buildings in Baku in the late 19th - early 20th centuries. The brothers built such monumental buildings as Ismailia, the Saadat Palace, the New Europe Hotel, and the Mitrofanov Palace. According to Fuad Akhundov, Kasumovs, who built most of the houses of Musa Nagiyev in Baku, carried out the construction work of all buildings raised at that time on the current streets of Istiglalliyyat, and 28 May. In addition, the brothers were involved in charity activity too.

Brothers 

Gasimov brothers' father, Haji Mamed Ali Molla Gasim oglu, owned a workshop for dyeing wool for carpets in Ordubad. The brothers came to work in Baku.

The elder brother, Haji Gasimov, was born in 1867. He started working in Baku as a simple carpenter. Soon he gathered around him the most skilful craftsmen and, together with his brothers, created a small artel, and later - a company engaged in construction works. The construction by the Gasimov brothers was carried out completely on a turnkey basis: the customer, having been familiarized with the project, only contributed with money and received the finished mansion by the appointed time. The purchase and delivery of materials, the construction work, the decoration of the facades and of the apartments - all this was undertaken by the company. Later, the brothers opened a parquet factory in Baku.

The middle brother, Ali Gasimov, was born in 1873. He was distinguished by his seriousness and calmness and was responsible for the financial issues in the company.

The younger brother, Imran Gasimov, being a very experienced contractor, was also a passionate art lover and an avid theatre-goer. He was also one of the first Azerbaijani actors. The rehearsals of the first national Azerbaijani opera "Leyli and Majnun", in 1907, were held in a large hall on the third floor of the Gasimovs' house. Imran Gasimov, a close friend of Uzeyir Hajibeyov, himself suggested this to the composer and took an active part in the preparation of the opera. Kasumov, who took on the acting pseudonym "Kengerlinsky", also played two roles in the premiere production of the opera "Leyli and Majnun" on 25 January 1908 - Leili's father, Fattah, and Mejnun's friend, Zeid. According to some reports, he also played the role of Nofel. In addition to his native language, he spoke Russian and French. He provided material support to the families of many actors. After a fire in a well-known bookstore at the intersection of Nikolaevskaya and Persidskaya streets (nowadays Istiglaliyyat and Murtuza Mukhtarov, respectively), Imran Gasimov completely took over not only its reconstruction, but also the purchase of new valuable books. Imran Gasimov died in an accident. As a contractor for the Murtuza Mukhtarov Palace under construction (nowadays the Saadat Palace), he personally supervised the installation of the statues, the decoration and the domes. During the installation on the upper tiers of the palace of a knight sculpture, which is still adorned there, he fell down. Unable to withstand the grief, his wife Rubaba khanim, poisoned herself 2 weeks later.

On 25 November 1918, a grandson is born to Haji Gasimov who is called Imran, in the memory of the tragically deceased brother of his grandfather. Years later, Imran Gasimov will become a playwright, screenwriter, People's Writer of the Azerbaijan SSR, laureate of the State Prize of the Azerbaijan SSR, and of the Order of Lenin.

Activity 

The Gasimov brothers, who carried out the orders of many millionaires, can be said to have been the contractors for the construction of most of Musa Nagiyev's houses. Only in 1908–1910, they were engaged in the construction of Nagiyev's 7 tenement houses and mansions. Along with the construction of these edifices, they built a house for themselves opposite the Baku Technical School. One of the largest stores of building materials in Baku, owned by the brothers, functioned on the first floor of the building. The upper floors of it were rented out.

The Gasimov brothers, who were involved in charity activities, also assisted in the construction of the Baku Real School, from 1900 to 1904. The reason for such a long time was that the City Duma did not have enough funds to finance a large-scale project. Large Baku industrialists joined the construction, investing their money in it. Their contractors were the Gasimov brothers. When the school building was almost ready, the brothers, at their own expense, covered all three floors with magnificent oak parquet.

After the occupation of Azerbaijan by the Red Army, the property of the Kasumov brothers was confiscated, and they themselves were put under arrest. However, a few days later they were released. Later, Haji Kasumov worked as a foreman at Azneft, under his leadership many houses were built, including the dwelling house of the State Bank employees. Ali Gasimov supervised the construction of the Barda-Khankendi road. During the new economic policy years, the brothers opened a small tome plant.

Houses built by brothers 
The Kasumov brothers were involved in the construction of the most of the houses of Musa Nagiyev, who owned about 100 buildings in Baku, as well as the main monumental buildings of the capital. According to Fuad Akhundov, the contracting office of the Kasumov brothers participated in the construction of all houses on the current streets of Istiglaliyyat, and 28 May. The list of main buildings built in Baku:

See also
 Johann Edel
 Józef Płoszko

References

Literature 
 
 
 
 
 

19th-century Azerbaijani people
20th-century Azerbaijani people
People from Ordubad
Azerbaijani families
Azerbaijani architects